The Irabere River, sometimes spelt Irebere River ( or), is a river in East Timor, a country occupying the eastern end of the island of Timor in the Lesser Sunda Islands of Wallacea.

Course
The river is one of the country's few perennial rivers. It flows south into the Timor Sea, forming the border between Lautém District to the east and Viqueque District to the west. Its estuary and adjacent forested land forms part of the Irabere estuary and Iliomar forest Important Bird Area.

Catchment

East Timor has been broadly divided into twelve 'hydrologic units', groupings of climatologically and physiographically similar and adjacent river catchments.

See also
 List of rivers of East Timor

References

External links

Baucau Municipality
Lautém Municipality
Rivers of East Timor
Viqueque Municipality